Bibasilaris is a genus of snout moths. It was described by Maria Alma Solis in 1993.

Species
Bibasilaris erythea (Druce, 1900)
Bibasilaris trisulcata (Warren, 1891)

References

Epipaschiinae
Pyralidae genera